Cochereau is a French surname. Notable people with the surname include:

 Léon Matthieu Cochereau (1793–1817), French painter
 Pierre Cochereau (1924–1984), French musician and composer

French-language surnames